Transilien Line R is a railway line of the Paris Transilien suburban rail network. The trains on this line travel between Paris-Gare-de-Lyon in central Paris, as well as from Melun station in the suburbs, and the south-east of Île-de-France region. Transilien services from Paris-Gare-de-Lyon are part of the SNCF Gare de Lyon rail network. The line has 60,000 passengers per weekday.

Stations served

Montargis line
Paris-Gare-de-Lyon
Melun station
Bois-le-Roi station
Fontainebleau–Avon station
Halte de Fontainebleau-Forêt
Thomery station
Moret-Veneux-les-Sablons station
Montigny-sur-Loing station
Bourron-Marlotte–Grez station
Nemours–Saint-Pierre station
Bagneaux-sur-Loing station
Souppes–Château-Landon station
Dordives station
Ferrières–Fontenay station
Montargis station

Montereau line
same route as the Montargis line between Paris-Gare-de-Lyon and Moret-Veneux-les-Sablons
Saint-Mammès station
Montereau station

Montereau line (via Héricy)
Melun station
Livry-sur-Seine station
Chartrettes station
Fontaine-le-Port station
Héricy station
Vulaines-sur-Seine–Samoreau station
Champagne-sur-Seine station
Vernou-sur-Seine station
La Grande-Paroisse station
Montereau station

Services 
There are three services, which are Paris-Gare-de-Lyon–Melun–Montargis, Paris-Gare-de-Lyon–Melun–Fontainebleau–Montereau and Melun–Héricy–Montereau. Like all other Transilien lines every train has a "name of service" consisting of four letters.

The first letter indicates the destination of the train. Trains to Montargis have a four-letter code beginning with G (GAMA, GAME, GAMO, GAMU, GOMO, GOMU), while those to Montereau have the first letter of the four always a K (KAMO, KOHO, KUMO). Trains to Paris-Gare de Lyon begin with P (POMA, POME, POMO, POMU, PUMA), which is also the first letter of the station's name. Those to Melun have a four-letter code beginning with Z (ZOHA).

The second letter indicates that the train might call at all stations, or at selected stations only. An "O" indicates an all stops train (French ), as in this case of GOMO, which is an all stops train to Montargis.

Trains running via Héricy have the letter H as the third letter (KOHO is an example), while trains running via Moret-Veneux-les-Sablons have the letter M as the third letter (KUMO is an example).

Rolling stock 
The Transilien R line is operated by Z 5600, Z 20500 and Regio 2N trains. The rolling stock of the line is shared with that of the RER line D.

Since December 8, 2017, forty-eight Regio 2N trainsets have been progressively delivered to enable the redeployment of twenty-four Z 2N double-deck trainsets on the network's other lines, as well as the deletion of the stainless steel Z 5300 trainsets. The Syndicat des transports d'Île-de-France (STIF) decided to acquire them, during the Board of Directors meeting of December 11, 2013, so that they would completely renew the current fleet.

The Regio 2N trains will be 110 m long, double-decker, with 582 seats per train. At peak times, they will run in multiples of three units, offering 1,746 seats and a total of 3,120 per train, for a total length of 330 m. These trains will offer passengers a maximum number of seats, given the long journey times of up to 1.5 hours (including half an hour without a stop between Paris and Melun). On the other hand, unlike the TER versions, the Transilien fleet will have no toilets, which has provoked strong reactions from regular users of the line.

The total investment amounts to more than 900 million euros, including the order for 43 Francilien trains for the H, K and L lines of the Transilien network. It is financed in equal parts by STIF and SNCF under the STIF/SNCF contract. The first 42 units were ordered in December 2014 at a cost of €397 million, with delivery of the first elements scheduled for September 2017 and full equipment of the line by the end of 2018

Current Fleet

Past fleet

See also
 List of Transilien stations

References

Transilien